Horacio Hidrovo Peñaherrera (June 24, 1931 - June 9, 2012) was an Ecuadorian poet, writer, professor, and cultural promoter.

He inherited his passion for poetry from his father, the poet Horacio Hidrovo Velásquez. In 2009 he was awarded Ecuador's National Prize "Premio Eugenio Espejo" in the Cultural Activities category.

He was born in Santa Ana, Ecuador in 1931. He was a literature professor at the University Laica Eloy Alfaro in Manabi, where he sought to strengthen oral tradition, theater and music.

Among his most popular poetry books were La maravillosa sensación de vivir (2001) and La Montaña (2003).

Works
 El montonero de Montecristi (1992)
 Jinetes en la noche (1948)
 Historia de la literatura manabita (1974)
 Se vende una ciudad: novela (1979)
 La usurpación de la tierra en América Latina (1991)
 Esperanza y desesperanza del montubio manabita (1991)
 Tauras o muertos que estan vivos (1985)
 Dimensión del dolor: poesía (1951)
 La mujer que nació así: novela (1982)
 Canto junto al fuego de los siglos (1978)
 Manzanas para los niños del mundo: poesía (1973)
 Los pájaros son hijos del viento: poesía (1987)
 La danza de los ángeles (2004)
 La novela (1975)
 La montaña (2003)
 
 Las huelas de tus sandalias (1974)
 La soledad es un domingo largo (2007)
 La novela manabita y su identidad regional: ensayo (1979)
 Album fotográfico de Manabí (1998) with Tatiana Hidrovo Quiñónez
 La maravillosa sensación de vivir (2001)

References 

1931 births
2012 deaths
Ecuadorian male poets
20th-century Ecuadorian poets
20th-century male writers
People from Santa Ana Canton